Mark Edward Kratzmann (born 17 May 1966) is a former Australian professional tennis player.

Tennis career
Kratzmann was an Australian Institute of Sport scholarship holder in 1983.

Juniors
As the world's No. 1 ranked junior player in 1984, Kratzmann won the boys' singles tournaments at the Australian Open, Wimbledon and the US Open that year.

Pro tour
As a professional player, Kratzmann won 18 doubles titles, including the Cincinnati Masters in 1990 (also reaching the Australian Open men's doubles final in 1989).

His best Grand Slam performance in singles was reaching the fourth round of the 1987 Australian Open. Kratzmann achieved a career-high singles ranking of world No. 50 in March 1990.

He sometimes partnered his brother Andrew in doubles matches.

After retirement
Kratzmann began to play cricket after moving to Hong Kong in 2003, where he originally worked as a tennis coach. He won the Hong Kong Cricket Association's Player of the Year award for 2005–06. In May 2007, he was selected in the national squad to participate in the ICC World Cricket League Division Three tournament. He was also in the 20-man list for the Asia Cup but was not included in the final 14. He has made three international appearances for Hong Kong.

ATP career finals

Doubles: 30 (18 titles, 12 runner-ups)

ATP Challenger and ITF Futures finals

Singles: 1 (0–1)

Doubles: 1 (0–1)

Junior Grand Slam finals

Singles: 5 (4 titles, 1 runner-up)

Doubles: 5 (4 titles, 1 runner-up)

Performance timelines

Singles

Doubles

Mixed doubles

References

External links
 
 
 
 
 Kratzmann Sports Asia
 The Age 2007 article
 
 

Australian emigrants to Hong Kong
Australian male tennis players
Australian Open (tennis) junior champions
French Open junior champions
Hong Kong cricketers
Hong Kong people of Australian descent
People from Wide Bay–Burnett
Tennis people from Queensland
US Open (tennis) junior champions
Wimbledon junior champions
1966 births
Living people
Australian people of German descent
Australian Institute of Sport tennis players
Cricketers from Queensland
Grand Slam (tennis) champions in boys' singles
Grand Slam (tennis) champions in boys' doubles
20th-century Australian people